Andrej Golić (born 10 February 1974 in Banja Luka, SFR Yugoslavia, Bosnia and Herzegovina) is a French team handball player. He competed at the 2000 Summer Olympics in Sydney, where the French team placed sixth.

References

External links
 
 
 

1974 births
Living people
Sportspeople from Banja Luka
French male handball players
Olympic handball players of France
Bosnia and Herzegovina male handball players
Handball players at the 2000 Summer Olympics
French people of Bosnia and Herzegovina descent
French people of Serbian descent
Bosnia and Herzegovina emigrants to France
Serbs of Bosnia and Herzegovina